Grujica Žeravica (1665–69) was a Serb hajduk commander active in the Ottoman territories of Herzegovina and southern Dalmatia during the Venetian–Ottoman war (1645–69). The hajduks, Ottoman subjects, crossed into Venetian territory from where they "jumped into" Ottoman territory. These guerilla forces closely cooperated and were recruited by the Republic of Venice to defend the Venetian–Ottoman frontier during the war. He was a comrade of acclaimed Bajo Pivljanin.

Žeravica hailed from Banjani, in the Sanjak of Herzegovina (now in western Montenegro). A 1665 appeal of hajduk leaders to Venice was signed by Bajo Pivljanin and Grujica Žeravica. In December 1669 Antonio Priuli brought from Perast to Venice hajduk leaders including Pivljanin, Žeravica, Vukosav Puhalović and buljubaša Milošević. Earlier, in June, the Venetian provveditore issued the termination of the "chiefs that protect the Kotor area", the first three mentioned, and had them included in the list of soldiers having the right of pay and bread. He had the rank of harambaša ("bandit leader").

Grujica Žeravica is known from Serbian epic poetry.

See also

Morlachs
Morlachs (Venetian irregulars)
Vuk Mandušić (fl. 1648), military commander in Venetian service
Stojan Janković (1636–1687), Morlach leader
Stanislav Sočivica, Venetian rebel
Sinobad
Cvijan Šarić
Petronije Selaković
Bajo Pivljanin
Vukosav Puhalović
Smiljanić family

References

Sources

17th-century Serbian people
17th-century births
17th-century deaths
Republic of Venice military personnel
Serbian military leaders
Serbs of Montenegro
Venetian period in the history of Montenegro
Hajduks
Serbs from the Ottoman Empire
Venetian Slavs
Cretan War (1645–1669)
Characters in Serbian epic poetry
Military personnel from Nikšić